Boursinidia is a genus of moths of the family Noctuidae. The genus name honours Charles Boursin, who worked extensively on the family Noctuidae. The type species is Boursinidia petrowskyi . It is the type genus for the tribe, Boursinidiini.

Selected species
Boursinidia atrimedia (Hampson, 1907)
Boursinidia darwini (Staudinger, 1899)

References

Noctuinae